The 1972 Thandwe crash occurred on 16 August in Burma. Shortly after the flight departed Thandwe Airport on its initial climb, the scheduled passenger flight for Burma Airways carrying 27 passengers and four crew suddenly fell from the sky and crashed into the sea, killing all four crew and all but three passengers. It was the first fatal accident for Burma Airways.

See also

 Aviation safety
 List of accidents and incidents involving commercial aircraft

References

Aviation accidents and incidents in 1972
Aviation accidents and incidents in Myanmar
Myanmar National Airlines accidents and incidents
1972 in Burma
August 1972 events in Asia
Airliner accidents and incidents with an unknown cause
Accidents and incidents involving the Douglas C-47 Skytrain
1972 disasters in Myanmar